In historical linguistics, transphonologization (also known as rephonologization or cheshirization, see below) is a type of sound change whereby a phonemic contrast that used to involve a certain feature X evolves in such a way that the contrast is preserved, yet becomes associated with a different feature Y.

For example, a language contrasting two words * vs. * may evolve historically so that final consonants are dropped, yet the modern language preserves the contrast through the nature of the vowel, as in a pair  vs. . Such a situation would be described by saying that a former contrast between oral and nasal consonants has been transphonologized into a contrast between oral and nasal vowels.

The term transphonologization was coined by André-Georges Haudricourt. The concept was defined and amply illustrated by Hagège & Haudricourt; it has been mentioned by several followers of panchronic phonology, and beyond.

Transphonologization resulting in a new contrast on vowels

Umlaut
A common example of transphonologization is Germanic umlaut. 
Germanic

As a specific instance of this, in prehistoric Old English, a certain class of nouns was marked by an  suffix in the (nominative) plural, but had no suffix in the (nominative) singular. A word like  "mouse", for example, had a plural  "mice". After umlaut, the plural became pronounced , where the long back vowel  was fronted, producing a new subphonemic front-rounded vowel , which serves as a secondary indicator of plurality. Subsequent loss of final , however, made  a phoneme and the primary indicator of plurality, leading to a distinction between  "mouse" and  "mice". This distinction survives in the modern forms "mouse"  and "mice" , although the specifics have been modified by the Great Vowel Shift.

Outside Germanic
Similar phenomena have been described in languages outside Germanic. 
 Seventeen Austronesian languages of northern Vanuatu have gone through a process whereby former *CVCV disyllables lost their final vowel, yet preserved their contrast through the creation of new vowels:  e.g. This resulted in the expansion of vowel inventories in the region, from an original five-vowel system (*a *e *i *o *u) to inventories ranging from 7 to 16 vowels (depending on the language).

Nasalization of vowels

 In French, a final  sound disappeared, but left its trace in the nasalization of the preceding vowel, as in vin blanc , from historical .
 In many languages (Sino-Tibetan, Austroasiatic, Oceanic, Celtic…), a vowel was nasalized by the nasal consonant preceding it: this "historical transfer of nasality between consonantal onset and vowel" is a case of transphonologization.

Compensatory lengthening

The distinction between the two words can, however, be preserved by (or transferred to) the length of the vowel (or in this case, diphthong), as vowels are pronounced longer before voiced consonants than before voiceless consonants.

Before disappearing, a sound may trigger or prevent some phonetic change in its vicinity that would not otherwise have occurred, and which may remain long afterward. For example:
 In the English word night,  the  sound (spelled gh) disappeared, but before, or perhaps as it did so (see "compensatory lengthening"), it lengthened the vowel , so that the word is pronounced  "nite" rather than the  "nit" that would otherwise be expected for a closed syllable.

Tone languages

The existence of contrastive tone in modern languages often originates in transphonologization of earlier contrasts between consonants: e.g. a former contrast of consonant voicing (* vs. *) transphonologizes to a tonal contrast (* vs. *)
 The tone split of Chinese, where the voiced consonants present in Middle Chinese lowered the tone of a syllable and subsequently lost their voicing in many varieties.
 Floating tones are generally the remains of entire disappeared syllables.

Transphonologization resulting in a new contrast on consonants
 Consonant mutation in Celtic languages (a lost vowel triggered initial consonant lenition, and a lost nasal triggered nasalization).
 In Sanskrit, voiced sibilants *z and *ž of the Proto-Indo-Iranian language were deleted, which lengthened the preceding vowel. Additionally, the elision of the sound *ž resulted in the following voiced dental consonant  to become retroflexed, as seen in the development of Proto-Indo-European *nizdós ("nest") --> Proto-Indo-Iranian *niždás --> Sanskrit nīḍáḥ. In case of a plain *z, the preceding vowel was lengthened without causing the retroflexion of the following consonant as seen in Proto-Indo-European *sízdeti ("sits down") --> Proto-Indo-Iranian *sízdati --> Sanskrit sī́dati.

Other examples
 The prevention of sound change by a lost consonant in Lahu;
 In Estonian and some other Uralic languages, when case endings are elided, the changed root indicates the presence of the case, see consonant gradation.

Other names 
Rephonologization was a term used by Roman Jakobson (1931 [1972]) to refer to essentially the same process but failed to catch on because of its ambiguity. In a 1994 paper, Norman (1994) used it again in the context of a proposed Old Chinese sound change that transferred a distinction formerly expressed through putative pharyngealization of the initial consonant of a syllable to one expressed through presence or absence of a palatal glide  before the main vowel of the syllable. That can be viewed as a special case of the broader process being described here.

James Matisoff (1991:443) coined cheshirization as a synonym for transphonologization. The term jokingly refers to the Cheshire Cat, a character in the book Alice in Wonderland, who "vanished quite slowly, beginning with the end of the tail, and ending with the grin, which remained some time after the rest of it had gone". Cheshirization has been used by some other authors (e.g. John McWhorter in McWhorter 2005, and Hilary Chappell in Chappell 2006).

Notes

References
 Chappell, Hilary. 2006, "Language contact and areal diffusion in Sinitic languages." In Areal diffusion and genetic inheritance: problems in comparative linguistics. Aleksandra Aikhenvald & Robert M. W. Dixon, eds. Oxford University Press, p. 344.
 Dahl, Östen, 2004, The Growth and Maintenance of Linguistic Complexity.  John Benjamins, p. 170.

 .
 
 
 
 
 
 
 Matisoff, James, 1991, "Areal and universal dimensions of grammatization in Lahu." In Approaches to grammaticalization, Traugott & Heine, eds. John Benjamins, pp. 383–453.
 
 McWhorter, John H., 2005, Defining Creole, Oxford University Press, pp. 12–13.
 

Historical linguistics
Linguistic morphology
Neologisms
Phonology